Wolongshan is a town in Jiaxiang, Jining, in southwestern Shandong province, China.

References

Township-level divisions of Shandong